The Old Rhinebeck Aerodrome is a living museum in Red Hook, New York. It owns many examples of airworthy aircraft of the Pioneer Era, World War I and the Golden Age of Aviation between the World Wars, and multiple examples of roadworthy antique automobiles.

History

The aerodrome was the creation of Cole Palen, who was partially inspired by the Shuttleworth Collection in England. He regularly flew many of the aircraft during weekend airshows as his alter-ego, "The Black Baron of Rhinebeck" (loosely based on the Red Baron). These airshows still continue mid-June through mid-October, and biplane rides are available before and after the shows. The simple early shows led to a philosophy of not only showing the aircraft in their natural environment, but also providing a fun and entertaining day out for the whole family. From this the series of weekend air shows that the Old Rhinebeck Aerodrome featured — still running to this day — was to become famous for what was developed. This included a zany melodrama, inspired by the storylines of silent film melodramas of the past, featuring Palen-created characters such as the daring Sir Percy Goodfellow doing battle with the evil Black Baron of Rhinebeck for the hand of the lovely Trudy Truelove.
Several associated antique/vintage auto club and vintage aircraft "type specific" events occur through the Aerodrome's event schedule, which has also included radio control scale aircraft "fly-in" low-pressure events, for flying scale models of aircraft of the 1903-1939 era that the museum's own full scale aircraft collection covers.  These events have been ongoing ever since the Aerodrome's opening year in 1966, with at least one aeromodeling event each year occurring over the early September weekend following the United States' Labor Day holiday, in co-operation with a local AMA-chartered RC model aircraft club, with entrants regularly coming from places as distant as Canada and Florida.

When Palen died in 1993, the non-profit Rhinebeck Aerodrome Museum assumed ownership. RAM is a Museum chartered by the New York State Board of Regents.

The museum's gift shop and model collection were destroyed in a fire on 20 August 2015.

Aircraft

Old Rhinebeck Aerodrome features numerous aircraft ranging from Wright-era reconstructions to biplanes and monoplanes of the 1930s. Among Palen's earliest additions to the museum in the mid-1960s was a Fokker Triplane reproduction, powered with a vintage Le Rhône 9J 110 hp rotary engine. It was built by Cole Palen for flight in his weekend airshows as early as 1967 and actively flown (mostly by Cole Palen) within the weekend airshows at Old Rhinebeck until the late 1980s. This aircraft, and a pair of Dr.I reproductions, each powered by radial engines, were flown for nearly two decades by Palen.  Both Cole's first rotary-engined reproduction, and the second of the stationary radial-powered reproductions, are now on static display. One of these is on loan at the New England Air Museum with the Le Rhône engine.

The Allied opponent for Palen's Triplane in the early years was mostly provided by a Sopwith Pup. It was begun in May 1964 and first flown three years later (May 1967) by his friend, Richard King, considered the co-founder of Old Rhinebeck Aerodrome with Palen, who flew his authentic 80-hp Le Rhône 9C-powered Pup reproduction in Old Rhinebeck's weekend airshows for many years, finally retiring the aircraft in the 1980s from active flying at Old Rhinebeck.  King eventually sold the aircraft in 1992 to the Owls Head Transportation Museum in Maine. It has returned and flies regularly,

In 1971 a replica was produced of the 1910 Short S.29 using a 60 hp ENV V-8 engine. An accurate Sopwith Dolphin reproduction was built by Palen, the first known airworthy reproduction of the Dolphin ever known to have been attempted. Powered by a vintage direct-drive Hispano-Suiza V-8 engine, this aircraft regularly flew at Palen's weekend air shows from 1980 onward. In September 1990, the aircraft's engine suffered a fuel pump failure, resulting in a crash landing into the trees surrounding the Old Rhinebeck museum's airstrip, with little damage to the reproduction Dolphin's airframe and no injuries to the pilot. The aircraft never directly struck the ground in the crash, and largely remained suspended in the tree canopy after the accident. The Dolphin was placed on static display until November 2007, when Old Rhinebeck Aerodrome began restoring it to flying condition. When completed, the aircraft will once again be painted in the markings of No. 19 Squadron.

Another German aircraft in the collection is an Albatros D.Va reproduction, which in 2015 was finished in the colors of Eduard Ritter von Schleich. It is powered by a modified six-cylinder, "uprighted" Fairchild Ranger engine, fitted after the original liquid-cooled Mercedes D.II engine sheared its crankshaft.

The collection also includes a restored 1909 Bleriot XI (including an original three cylinder Anzani radial engine) that is believed to be the second oldest airworthy aircraft in the world

In 2016 an extremely accurate reproduction of the Spirit of St. Louis was added to the collection following a 20-year building process and first test flight in December 2015.

Old Rhinebeck Aerodrome has had two airworthy Fokker D.VIII reproductions, each powered with a restored Gnome 9N Monosoupape rotary engine, both being built by Brian Coughlin of New York State — these have since been sold to Javier Arango in California for his private collection of reproduction WW I aircraft, and to Kermit Weeks' Fantasy of Flight living aviation museum in Florida. One of the Coughlin DVIII Fokkers returned to the Aerodrome in 2016.

Fatal accident
At Rhinebeck, New York on August 17, 2008, around 4 p.m. during the performance of a simulated dogfight at the aerodrome, Vincent Nasta of Wading River, New York died of injuries sustained when his plane crashed in to a heavily wooded area 1000 feet from the runway and performance area. The aircraft being used was part of the aerodrome's World War I collection and was reported to be a reproduction French Nieuport 24, obtained from a New Zealand facility.  It was the first fatality during an airshow at the facility.

References

Notes

Bibliography
 King, Richard. "Pushing My Luck (One Time Too Often)". The Skies Over Rhinebeck: A Pilot's Story. Bloomington, Minnesota: Jostens, 1997. .

Further reading
 Bainbridge, E. Gordon.The Old Rhinebeck Aerodrome. Fort Lauderdale, Florida: Exposition Pr of Florida, 1977. .
 King, Richard & Wilkinson, Stephen. The Skies Over Rhinebeck: A Pilot's Story. Bloomington, Minnesota: Jostens, 1997. .
 Vines, Mike. Return to Rhinebeck: Flying Vintage Aeroplanes. Ramsbury, UK: Airlife Publishing Ltd., 1999. .
 Vines, Mike. Wind in the Wires: A Golden Era of Flight, 1909-1939. Ramsbury, UK: Airlife Publishing Ltd., 1995. .

External links

 Old Rhinebeck Aerodrome website
 Website dedicated to Cole Palen, founder of ORA
Old Rhinebeck Aerodrome, Photos of the Old Rhinebeck Aerodrome Museum and World War I era airshow in Rhinebeck, New York
 Photos of the Aerodrome Collection
 Photographs of Cole Palen's Old Rhinebeck Aerodrome
 Old Rhinebeck Aerodrome: Museum Collection & Air Show Guide – Issuu

Aerospace museums in New York (state)
Airports for antique aircraft
Automobile museums in New York (state)
Aviation in New York (state)
Museums in Dutchess County, New York
Red Hook, New York
Transportation buildings and structures in Dutchess County, New York
World War I museums in the United States